Jensdatter is a Danish surname. Notable people with the surname include:

 Dorte Jensdatter (1672–1722), Danish murder victim
 Vibeke Jensdatter (1638–1709), Danish merchant

Danish-language surnames
Patronymic surnames